Jaan Ammermann (1889 Uuemõisa (now Saaremaa Parish), Kreis Ösel – Kronstadt?) was an Estonian politician. He was a member of the Estonian Constituent Assembly, representing the Estonian Social Democratic Workers' Party.

References

1889 births
Year of death missing
People from Saaremaa Parish
People from Kreis Ösel
Estonian Social Democratic Workers' Party politicians
Members of the Estonian Constituent Assembly